Al-Huwaylah is a village in east-central Yemen. It is located in the Hadhramaut Governorate.

External links
Towns and villages in the Hadhramaut Governorate

Populated places in Hadhramaut Governorate